Shrek is a 2001 film from DreamWorks Animation.

Shrek may also refer to:

Shrek franchise topics 
 Shrek (franchise), the entire Shrek film series
 Shrek!, a children's book on which the franchise is loosely based
 Shrek (character), protagonist of the book and the film series
 Shrek The Musical, a 2008 Broadway musical based on the first film in the series
 Shrek 4-D, a 4D film screened at various theme parks
 Shrek (video game)
 Shrek: Music from the Original Motion Picture
 Shrek: Original Motion Picture Score

Other 
 Shrek (album), by Marc Ribot and its title track
 Shrek (sheep), the runaway sheep who gained fame by evading capture for six years, named after the fictional character
 Markook shrek, a Middle Eastern flatbread

See also
 Shreck (disambiguation)
 Schreck (disambiguation)